The American Candy Company is a confectioner specializing in old-fashioned hard candies.

History
The American Candy Company was founded in 1899 in Selma, Alabama. The company was sold by the Gibson Family in 1989 to the Pinkerton Group in Richmond, Virginia. Their wax candy division was sold to Concord Confections in 2002, and this division is now part of Tootsie Roll Industries.

Products
Twirl Pops 
Old Fashioned Sticks 
Candy Canes
Starlight Mints
Lollipops
Long Boy Soft Chews

References
Confectioner, June 2002. Candy Product Update.
History of NECCO

Confectionery companies of the United States
American companies established in 1899
Food and drink companies established in 1899
Selma, Alabama
Companies based in Alabama
1899 establishments in Alabama